Charles Chetwynd Chetwynd-Talbot, 2nd Earl Talbot, KG,  PC, FRS (25 April 1777 – 10 January 1849), styled Viscount of Ingestre between 1784 and 1793, was a British politician and slave holder. He served as Lord Lieutenant of Ireland between 1817 and 1821.

Background and education
Born as Charles Talbot, he was the eldest son of John Talbot of Ingestre Hall and his wife, Lady Charlotte Hill, a daughter of Wills Hill, 1st Marquess of Downshire. When John Talbot was created Earl Talbot and Viscount of Ingestre in 1784, Charles Talbot assumed the latter title as a courtesy title. His father also added Chetwynd to the family name in 1786.

He inherited his father's earldom and the Ingestre estate in 1793, matriculated from Christ Church, Oxford in 1794 and graduated as a Master of Arts in 1797. He commissioned the architect John Nash to renovate Ingestre around 1810.

Early career
After leaving Oxford, Lord Talbot joined the British embassy in Russia under Lord Whitworth, forming a lasting friendship with his boss. In 1803, Lord Talbot organised a volunteer force in Staffordshire to oppose a planned invasion by Napoleon. In 1812, he was appointed Lord Lieutenant of that county, an office he held until his death. He was elected a Fellow of the Royal Society in 1813.

Lord Lieutenant of Ireland
In 1817, Talbot was also appointed Lord Lieutenant of Ireland and admitted to the Privy Council. In recognition of his rendering services to the agriculture of Ireland, he was awarded the Freedom of Drogheda and during George IV's visit to the country in 1821, he was appointed a Knight of St Patrick. Although an opponent of Catholic emancipation, Daniel O'Connell gave Talbot credit for his impartiality and Lord Cloncurry called him 'an honourable, high-minded gentleman'. However, the growing discontent in Ireland under Talbot's administration, forced the Prime Minister, Lord Liverpool, to have him replaced with Lord Wellesley in December 1821.

Later life
In 1833, Lord Talbot was encouraged to stand for the chancellorship of Oxford University, but withdrew in deference to the Duke of Wellington. In 1839, in recognition of his services as Lord Lieutenant of Staffordshire, Talbot received a testimonial of £1400, which he used to endow a new church at Salt, Staffordshire. A supporter of Robert Peel, he resigned as a Knight of St Patrick in place of being appointed a Knight of the Garter in 1844, on Peel's recommendation. Lord Talbot subsequently supported the repeal of the Corn Laws, being one of the first peers to do so.

As a Staffordshire landowner, Lord Talbot gave land at Hixton for construction of the parish church in 1846 and had the Red Lion Public House at Brereton rebuilt in 1847.

Slave holder
According to the Legacies of British Slave-Ownership at the University College London, Talbot was compensated in the aftermath of the Slavery Abolition Act 1833 with the Slave Compensation Act 1837.

Talbot was associated with "T71/854 St John claim no. 64A (Worthy Park)" and "T71/855 St Thomas-in-the-Vale claim no. 321A (Mickleton Pen)", he owned 543 slaves in Jamaica and received a £4,660 combined payment at the time (worth £ in ).

Family

Lord Talbot married Frances Thomasine (d. 1819), daughter of Charles Lambart, in 1800. They had eleven surviving children:
 Lady Frances Charlotte (1801–1823), married William Legge, 4th Earl of Dartmouth
 Charles Thomas, styled Viscount Ingestre (1802–1826)
 Henry John, later styled Viscount Ingestre, later 3rd Earl Talbot and 18th Earl of Shrewsbury.
 Arthur (1805–1884), clergyman.
 John (1806–1852), judge and member of the Canterbury Association. Father of John Gilbert Talbot.
 Lady Cecil Chetwynd (1808–1877), married John Kerr, 7th Marquess of Lothian.
 (George) Gustavus (1810–1896), clergyman.
 William Whitworth (1814–1888), clergyman.
 Gilbert Chetwynd (1816–1896), clergyman.
 Wellington Patrick Manvers (1817–1898), soldier.
 Gerald (1819–1885)

Lady Talbot died in December 1819, less than three months after the birth of her youngest child. Lord Talbot died at his home, Ingestre Hall, in January 1849, aged 71, and was succeeded by his eldest surviving son, Henry, who later also inherited the earldom of Shrewsbury from his distant cousin.

Ancestry

References

 
 Cokayne et al., The Complete Peerage

1777 births
1849 deaths
Alumni of Christ Church, Oxford
Diplomatic peers
Earls Talbot
Knights of St Patrick
Knights of the Garter
Lords Lieutenant of Ireland
Lord-Lieutenants of Staffordshire
Members of the Privy Council of the United Kingdom
Charles Talbot
Fellows of the Royal Society
Recipients of payments from the Slavery Abolition Act 1833
British slave owners
Barons Talbot